Lewis Milton Goldwasser (1885 Łódź, Congress Poland - 1950, Miami, Florida, US) was a composer, pianist and band leader immensely popular in New York City from the late-1910s to the early 1930s.  His orchestra was an all-white band (as were most of the commercially successful bands in those days due to the limitations placed on African American musicians at the time) playing African American music active at first during the late 1910s and early 1920s in live music venues and later, from the mid 1920s through the 1930s, mostly in studio recordings, using several pseudonyms for the different labels.

Over the years, his birth name of Lewis Milton Goldwasser metamorphosed first into Lew Gold, then Lou Gold, and finally into Louis M. Gould (the name that appears on his tombstone).  In 1932, he and his wife Doris A. Mabel (Reynolds) Gould, relocated to Miami, Florida, where he played at the Triton Hotel in Miami Beach for seven years. Lou died in 1950, and his wife followed him in 1951. He worked with Benny Goodman, Vincent Lopez, Tommy Dorsey, Abe Lyman, and many others.

External links
 

1885 births
1950 deaths
American jazz bandleaders
Polish jazz musicians
American jazz composers
American male jazz composers
20th-century American male musicians
Congress Poland emigrants to the United States